The 1962–63 NBA season was the Celtics' 17th season in the NBA. The Celtics finished the season by winning their sixth NBA Championship.

Offseason

NBA Draft
The 1962 NBA Draft results were:

Regular season

Season standings

Record vs. opponents

Game log

Player stats
Note: GP= Games played; REB= Rebounds; AST= Assists; STL = Steals; BLK = Blocks; PTS = Points; AVG = Average

Playoffs

|- align="center" bgcolor="#ffcccc"
| 1
| March 28
| Cincinnati
| L 132–135
| Sam Jones (30)
| Bill Russell (24)
| Bob Cousy (9)
| Boston Garden13,798
| 1–0
|- align="center" bgcolor="#ccffcc"
| 2
| March 29
| @ Cincinnati
| W 125–102
| Bill Russell (26)
| Bill Russell (24)
| —
| Cincinnati Gardens11,102
| 1–1
|- align="center" bgcolor="#ffcccc"
| 3
| March 31
| Cincinnati
| L 116–121
| Tom Heinsohn (28)
| Bill Russell (28)
| Bob Cousy (7)
| Boston Garden13,909
| 1–2
|- align="center" bgcolor="#ccffcc"
| 4
| April 3
| @ Cincinnati
| W 128–110
| Bill Russell (26)
| Bill Russell (21)
| —
| Cincinnati Gardens3,498
| 2–2
|- align="center" bgcolor="#ccffcc"
| 5
| April 6
| Cincinnati
| W 125–120
| Tom Heinsohn (34)
| Bill Russell (26)
| Bob Cousy (8)
| Boston Garden13,909
| 3–2
|- align="center" bgcolor="#ffcccc"
| 6
| April 7
| @ Cincinnati
| L 99–109
| Sam Jones (22)
| Bill Russell (23)
| —
| Cincinnati Gardens7,745
| 3–3
|- align="center" bgcolor="#ccffcc"
| 7
| April 10
| Cincinnati
| W 142–131
| Sam Jones (47)
| Bill Russell (24)
| Bob Cousy (16)
| Boston Garden13,909
| 4–3
|-

|- align="center" bgcolor="#ccffcc"
| 1
| April 14
| Los Angeles
| W 117–114
| Sam Jones (29)
| Bill Russell (29)
| Bob Cousy (11)
| Boston Garden13,909
| 1–0
|- align="center" bgcolor="#ccffcc"
| 2
| April 16
| Los Angeles
| W 113–106
| Sam Jones (27)
| Bill Russell (38)
| Bob Cousy (11)
| Boston Garden13,909
| 2–0
|- align="center" bgcolor="#ffcccc"
| 3
| April 17
| @ Los Angeles
| L 99–119
| Sam Jones (30)
| Bill Russell (19)
| Bill Russell (5)
| Los Angeles Memorial Sports Arena15,493
| 2–1
|- align="center" bgcolor="#ccffcc"
| 4
| April 19
| @ Los Angeles
| W 108–105
| Tom Heinsohn (35)
| Bill Russell (19)
| three players tied (5)
| Los Angeles Memorial Sports Arena16,382
| 3–1
|- align="center" bgcolor="#ffcccc"
| 5
| April 21
| Los Angeles
| L 119–126
| Sam Jones (36)
| Bill Russell (27)
| Bob Cousy (14)
| Boston Garden13,909
| 3–2
|- align="center" bgcolor="#ccffcc"
| 6
| April 24
| @ Los Angeles
| W 112–109
| Tom Heinsohn (22)
| Bill Russell (24)
| Bill Russell (9)
| Los Angeles Memorial Sports Arena15,652
| 4–2
|-

Awards and honors
Bill Russell, NBA Most Valuable Player Award
Bill Russell, All-NBA First Team
Bob Cousy, All-NBA Second Team
Tom Heinsohn, All-NBA Second Team
John Havlicek, NBA All-Rookie Team 1st Team
Nine players are enshrined in the Naismith Memorial Basketball Hall of Fame.

References

 Celtics on Database Basketball
  Celtics on Basketball Reference

Boston Celtics seasons
NBA championship seasons
Boston Celtics
Boston Celtics
Boston Celtics
1960s in Boston